Herbert Cohen may refer to:

 Herbert B. Cohen (1900–1970), American judge
 Herbert L. Cohen (died 1983), American lawyer and politician from Connecticut
 Herbert Cohen (fencer) (born 1940), American Olympic fencer
Sir Herbert Cohen, 2nd Baronet of the Cohen baronets
 Herb Cohen (1932–2010), American music manager and record company executive
 Herb Cohen (negotiator), American negotiation expert

See also
Cohen (surname)